The UNLV Rebels college football team represents the University of Nevada, Las Vegas (UNLV) in the Mountain West Conference (MW). The Rebels compete as part of the NCAA Division I Football Bowl Subdivision. The program has had 13 head coaches since it began play during the 1968 season. Since December 2022, Barry Odom has served as head coach at UNLV.

Five coaches have led UNLV in playoff or postseason bowl games: Tony Knap, Harvey Hyde, Jeff Horton, John Robinson, and Bobby Hauck. Two of those coaches also won conference championships: Hyde captured one as a member of the Pacific Coast Athletic Association; and Horton captured one as a member of the Big West Conference.

Knap and Robinson are the leaders in seasons coached with six years as head coach each. Knap is the leader games won with 47. Ron Meyer has the highest winning percentage at 0.771. Hyde has the lowest winning percentage of those who have coached more than one game, with 0.185. Of the 13 different head coaches who have led the Rebels, Robinson has been inducted into the College Football Hall of Fame.

Key

Coaches

Notes

References

UNLV

UNLV Rebels football